The São Paulo gubernatorial election was held on 5 October 2014 to elect the next governor of the state of São Paulo. If no candidate had received more than 50% of the vote, a second-round runoff election would have been held on 26 October. Incumbent Governor Geraldo Alckmin won re-election in the first round.

Candidates

Governor

Senator

Debates

Opinions polls

Governor

Senator

Results

Governor

Senator

Chamber of Deputies

Legislative Assembly

References

2014 Brazilian gubernatorial elections
October 2014 events in South America
2014